Pitseng Pass is situated in the Eastern Cape, province of South Africa, on the R396 road between Mount Fletcher and Barkly East.

Mountain passes of the Eastern Cape